Beth Morgan may refer to:

 Beth Morgan (basketball) (born 1975), American basketball player
 Beth Morgan (cricketer) (born 1981), English cricketer
 Beth Morgan (Hollyoaks), a character in UK soap opera Hollyoaks

See also
Elizabeth Morgan (disambiguation)